is a Japanese fencer. He competed in the team foil events at the 1968 and 1972 Summer Olympics.

References

External links
 

1946 births
Living people
Japanese male foil fencers
Olympic fencers of Japan
Fencers at the 1968 Summer Olympics
Fencers at the 1972 Summer Olympics
Sportspeople from Hyōgo Prefecture
Asian Games medalists in fencing
Fencers at the 1974 Asian Games
Asian Games gold medalists for Japan
Asian Games silver medalists for Japan
Asian Games bronze medalists for Japan
Medalists at the 1974 Asian Games
21st-century Japanese people
20th-century Japanese people